God of destruction may refer to:

Religion and mythology
Batara Kala, Indonesian god of the underworld, time, and destruction
Nergal, Mesopotamian god of the sun, underworld, war, and destruction
Perses (Titan), god of destruction in Greek mythology

Shiva, one of the principal deities of Hinduism, known as The Destroyer
Kali, wife of Shiva's aspect, Mahakala
Owuo, Akan god of Death and Destruction. Known as the Death of Creation (The Destroyer)

Fictional uses
Bastard!! The Dark God of Destruction, a 1988 Japanese manga series
Magu-chan: God of Destruction, a 2020 Japanese manga series
Trillion: God of Destruction, a 2015 Japanese video game
Beerus, the God of Destruction, a character in the Dragon Ball franchise
Yami Sukehiro, the Destruction God, a character in the manga series Black Clover
Alexander, God of Destruction, a character from the 2005 video game Makai Kingdom: Chronicles of the Sacred Tome
Plagg, the God of Destruction, a character in the cartoon Miraculous: Tales of Ladybug & Cat Noir

See also
Chaos gods
List of war deities